The 1844 United States presidential election in Vermont took place between November 1 and December 4, 1844, as part of the 1844 United States presidential election. Voters chose six representatives, or electors to the Electoral College, who voted for President and Vice President.

Vermont voted for the Whig candidate, Henry Clay, over Democratic candidate James K. Polk and Liberty candidate James G. Birney. Clay won Vermont by a margin of 17.88%.

With 54.84% of the popular vote, Vermont would prove to be Henry Clay's second strongest state after Rhode Island. The Green Mountain State would also prove to be James G. Birney's third strongest state after New Hampshire and Massachusetts.

Results

See also
 United States presidential elections in Vermont

References

Vermont
1844
1844 Vermont elections